The 2001–02 NBA season was the 35th season for the Seattle SuperSonics in the National Basketball Association. During the off-season, the Sonics signed free agents Calvin Booth, and Jerome James. Heading into Nate McMillan's first full season as head coach, the Sonics struggled losing five of their first seven games, and held a 9–14 start to the season. However, they won 14 of their next 20 games and played above .500 for the remainder of the season, holding a 25–23 record at the All-Star break, but lost six of their final eight games, finishing fourth in the Pacific Division with a 45–37 record, which was only a one-game improvement over the previous season where they missed the playoffs.

Gary Payton averaged 22.1 points, 9.0 assists and 1.6 steals per game, and was named to the All-NBA Second Team, NBA All-Defensive First Team, and was selected for the 2002 NBA All-Star Game. In addition, Rashard Lewis averaged 16.8 points and 7.0 rebounds per game, while Brent Barry provided the team with 14.4 points per game, Vin Baker contributed 14.1 points and 6.4 rebounds per game, but only played 55 games due to a shoulder injury, second-year forward Desmond Mason provided with 12.4 points per game off the bench, and top draft pick Vladimir Radmanovic was named to the NBA All-Rookie Second Team. Payton also finished in sixth place in Most Valuable Player voting.

However, their season would end quickly as the Sonics lost in five games in the Western Conference First Round of the playoffs to the San Antonio Spurs led by Tim Duncan, who was MVP following the season. This season was also Payton's final full season in Seattle, as he was traded to the Milwaukee Bucks midway next season. Also following the season, Baker was traded to the Boston Celtics, and second round draft pick Earl Watson signed as a free agent with the Memphis Grizzlies.

For the season, the Sonics changed their primary logo, and added new uniforms, going back to their traditional color scheme of emerald green and yellow. The logo and uniforms both remained in use until 2008.

Draft picks

Roster

Roster Notes
 Point Guard Shammond Williams holds American and Georgian dual citizenship. He was born in the United States but he later played on the Georgian national team.

Regular season

Season standings

z - clinched division title
y - clinched division title
x - clinched playoff spot

Record vs. opponents

Game log

Playoffs

|- align="center" bgcolor="#ffcccc"
| 1
| April 20
| @ San Antonio
| L 89–110
| Vin Baker (22)
| Vin Baker (7)
| four players tied (2)
| Alamodome23,634
| 0–1
|- align="center" bgcolor="#ccffcc"
| 2
| April 22
| @ San Antonio
| W 98–90
| Gary Payton (21)
| Gary Payton (11)
| Gary Payton (5)
| Alamodome23,059
| 1–1
|- align="center" bgcolor="#ffcccc"
| 3
| April 27
| San Antonio
| L 75–102
| Gary Payton (20)
| Brent Barry (8)
| Gary Payton (6)
| KeyArena17,072
| 1–2
|- align="center" bgcolor="#ccffcc"
| 4
| May 1
| San Antonio
| W 91–79
| Gary Payton (28)
| Gary Payton (12)
| Gary Payton (11)
| KeyArena17,072
| 2–2
|- align="center" bgcolor="#ffcccc"
| 5
| May 3
| @ San Antonio
| L 78–101
| Gary Payton (23)
| Gary Payton (9)
| Gary Payton (5)
| Alamodome23,369
| 2–3
|-

Player statistics

Season

Provided by Basketball-Reference.com: View Original Table Generated 2/17/2017.

Playoffs

Provided by Basketball-Reference.com: View Original Table Generated 2/17/2017.

Awards and records
 Gary Payton, All-NBA Second Team
 Gary Payton, NBA All-Defensive First Team
 Vladimir Radmanovic, NBA All-Rookie Team 2nd Team

Transactions

References

See also
 2001-02 NBA season

Seattle SuperSonics seasons